Darrara or Darrary is a rural townland near Clonakilty, County Cork in Ireland. Evidence of ancient settlement in the area include a restored Iron Age ringfort and a megalithic standing stone (on the grounds of Sacred Heart church).

See also
 Lios na gCon

References

Townlands of County Cork